Hidalgo is a village in Jasper County, Illinois, United States. The population was 106 at the 2010 census.

Geography
Hidalgo is located in northern Jasper County. Illinois Route 130 passes through the east side of the village, leading north  to Greenup and south  to Newton, the Jasper county seat.

Demographics

As of the census of 2000, there were 123 people, 50 households, and 31 families residing in the village. The racial makeup of the village was 100.00% White.

There were 50 households, out of which 34.0% had children under the age of 18 living with them, 48.0% were married couples living together, 6.0% had a female householder with no husband present, and 38.0% were non-families. 34.0% of all households were made up of individuals, and 22.0% had someone living alone who was 65 years of age or older. The average household size was 2.46 and the average family size was 3.16.

In the village, the population was spread out, with 27.6% under the age of 18, 10.6% from 18 to 24, 22.0% from 25 to 44, 23.6% from 45 to 64, and 16.3% who were 65 years of age or older. The median age was 33 years. For every 100 females, there were 86.4 males. For every 100 females age 18 and over, there were 97.8 males.

The median income for a household in the village was $25,972, and the median income for a family was $26,875. Males had a median income of $25,417 versus $20,000 for females. The per capita income for the village was $13,167. 6.3% of the population was living below the poverty line. None under the age of 18 or over the age of 64 were reported below the poverty line.

References

Villages in Jasper County, Illinois
Villages in Illinois